Selenisa affulgens is a species of moth in the family Erebidae. The species is known from Madagascar.  It has a wingspan of 29 mm. The palpae are twice as long as its short head. Legs are short and scaled. The upperside is greyish brown-black except the thorax and triangular shaped stripe of the same width on the forewings.  The underside is brownish ash grey.

References

Omopterini
Moths described in 1881
Owlet moths of Africa
Moths of Madagascar
Moths of Africa